This is a list of ships built by John I. Thornycroft & Company at the yard at Chiswick, England. Production of larger ships moved to the yard at Woolston in 1904 and production at Chiswick ceased in 1909.

Ships and boats 
Some early boats are not yet documented online. A large part of the information has been provided by the Miramar Ship Index (www.miramarshipindex.org.nz) through a Wikipedia partnership. However, the official lists of vessels built by Thornycroft (at both Chiswick and at Woolston) are available in the unpublished (but officially recognised) Thornycroft List of 1981 researched and compiled by the late David Lyon with assistance of Thornycroft personnel and the company's archives.

See also
 List of ships built at John I. Thornycroft & Company, Woolston

References

Further reading 

 John I. Thornycroft
John I. Thornycroft, Chiswick